The Last Set at Newport is a 1971 live album by Dave Brubeck and his quartet recorded at the 1971 Newport Jazz Festival, shortly before a riot ensued. The album peaked at 16 on the Billboard Top Jazz Charts.

Reception

The album was reviewed by Scott Yanow at Allmusic who wrote that "The Dave Brubeck-Gerry Mulligan quartet is heard in a very inspired performance at the Newport Jazz Festival, just a short time before a riot by the audience closed the festival. These versions of "Take Five" and "Open the Gates" are memorable, but it is the extended "Blues for Newport" that is truly classic." Yanow wrote that the musicians "...constantly challenge each other during this exciting performance, making this set well-worth searching for."

Track listing 
 Introduction by Father Norman O'Connor - 0:39
 "Blues for Newport" (Dave Brubeck) - 16:24
 "Take Five" (Paul Desmond) - 9:49
 "Open the Gates (Out of the Way of the People)" (Brubeck) - 8:12

Personnel 
 Dave Brubeck - piano, producer
 Gerry Mulligan - baritone saxophone
 Jack Six - double bass
 Alan Dawson - drums
Production
 Aaron Baron, Larry Dahlstrom, Tom Dowd - engineer
 George Wein - liner notes, producer
 David Gahr - photography
 Nesuhi Ertegun - producer
 Michael Cuscuna, Lewis Hahn - remixing

References

1971 live albums
Albums produced by Nesuhi Ertegun
Albums recorded at the Newport Jazz Festival
Atlantic Records live albums
Dave Brubeck live albums
Live instrumental albums